Furah is a coastal town on Kamaran Island, Yemen.

Populated places in Al Hudaydah Governorate
Populated coastal places in Yemen